Cambarus robustus, known generally as the robust crayfish or Big Water crayfish, is a species of crayfish in the family Cambaridae. It is found in North America.

The IUCN conservation status of Cambarus robustus is "LC", least concern, with no immediate threat to the species' survival. The population is stable. The IUCN status was reviewed in 2010.

References

Further reading

External links

 

Cambaridae
Articles created by Qbugbot
Crustaceans described in 1852
Freshwater crustaceans of North America